Herman C. Wipperman (July 28, 1853 – July 3, 1939) was a member of the Wisconsin State Assembly and Wisconsin State Senate.

Early life and education
Herman C. Wipperman was born in Mosel, Wisconsin on July 28, 1853. He moved to Chilton, Wisconsin in 1873. After studying carpentry, he and his brother operated a furniture business in Chilton until 1886. In 1889, he graduated from the University of Wisconsin Law School.

Career
After graduating from the University of Wisconsin, Wipperman practiced law in Chilton until August 1891. Then, he moved to Grand Rapids, Wisconsin. After moving to Grand Rapids, he practiced law with B. R. Goggins. He served as the City Attorney of Grand Rapids from 1893 to 1895. Wipperman then served two terms as Mayor of Grand Rapids from 1896 to April 1900. He ran the city as it was merging with Centralia and Grand Rapids were joined. He turned over the management of Grand Rapids to his former associate, B.R. Goggins, the mayor for the new city, Wisconsin Rapids.

He was a member of the Assembly from 1895 to 1898 before serving as District Attorney of Wood County, Wisconsin from 1901 to 1902. Later, he was a member of the Senate from 1903 to 1906. He was a Republican.

In 1904, Wipperman proposed moving Wisconsin's capital from Madison to Grand Rapids after a fire at the Wisconsin State Capitol on February 26, 1904. Despite support from local newspapers, the proposal ultimately got buried in committee.

Shortly after 1906, Wipperman moved to Muscogee, Oklahoma.

Personal life
Wipperman had two sons and one daughter: E. C. Wipperman, Richard O. Wipperman, and Mrs. Goodell.

Death
Wipperman died on July 3, 1939 at his daughter's house in Chicago. He is buried in Rothmann Cemetery in Calumet County, Wisconsin.

References

External links
 The Political Graveyard
 

People from Mosel, Wisconsin
People from Chilton, Wisconsin
People from Wisconsin Rapids, Wisconsin
Republican Party Wisconsin state senators
Republican Party members of the Wisconsin State Assembly
Mayors of places in Wisconsin
Wisconsin lawyers
University of Wisconsin Law School alumni
University of Wisconsin–Madison alumni
1853 births
1939 deaths